Liwaito may refer to:

Liwaito, California
Putah Creek, Liwaito in the native language